The Argentina women's youth national handball team is the national under-17 handball team of Argentina. Controlled by the Argentinean Handball Confederation that is an affiliate of the International Handball Federation and also a part of the South and Central America Handball Confederation, the team represents the country in international matches.

History

Statistics

Youth Olympic Games 

 Champions   Runners up   Third place   Fourth place

IHF World Championship 

 Champions   Runners up   Third place   Fourth place

Squad
Last world championship
 1 BOHNER Martina
 2 PRADO Camila
 3 VIVIERS Clarita
 4 BONO Carolina
 5 CAVO Guadalupe
 6 RIOS Gala Irene
 7 RIVERO Noelia
 8 PELETAY RITACCO Julieta
 9 VILLARRAZZA Agustina
 10 IRRIBARRIA Camila
 11 VAZQUEZ Lupe
 12 GARRIDO Rosario
 13 AZCUNE Sol
 14 BALLADA Sofia
 15 BAGGIO Yamila Aylen
 17 CUCCUINI Julieta

Notable players

References

External links 
 Official Website 

Handball in Argentina
Women's handball in Argentina
Women's national youth handball teams
Handball